Chaman ganj is a residential area situated in the heart of Kanpur in the Indian state of Uttar Pradesh.

Demography

References

External links

Neighbourhoods in Kanpur